Willie "The Wisp" Galimore (March 30, 1935 – July 27, 1964) was an American professional football player who was a halfback in the National Football League (NFL) for the Chicago Bears from 1957–1963.  He attended Florida A&M University, working with the legendary coach Jake Gaither.  Galimore is a member of the College Football Hall of Fame.

Galimore possessed incredible speed and lateral movement; many of the opposing players of the time stated that they believed Galimore could run side-to-side down the field just as fast as most men could in a straight line.  His running style could be said to most resemble the style of Billy Sims or perhaps Terrell Davis, but faster.

In a documentary short by NFL Films on Galimore, it was said that he was probably the last great find before NFL scouting became sophisticated.  Bears assistant coach Phil Handler, while scouting for talent in Florida, received a tip about Galimore's prowess as a halfback, and the Bears subsequently drafted him in the fifth round (58th overall) of the 1956 NFL Draft. His contemporaries (including Chuck Bednarik and Doug Atkins) referred to Galimore as one of the best runners they ever faced.

Galimore's last visit to his hometown of St. Augustine, Florida came just weeks before his death, and he participated in the St. Augustine movement during the Civil Rights Movement, becoming the first Black person who was able to register as a guest at the previously all-white Ponce de Leon Motor Lodge (where the arrest of the 72-year-old mother of the governor of Massachusetts for trying to be served in a racially integrated group had made national headlines a few months before).  Galimore's civil rights activism is honored with a Freedom Trail marker at his home at 57 Chapin Street in St. Augustine.  His widow, Mrs. Audrey Galimore, took part in the dedication of the marker on July 2, 2007.  A community center in the historic Lincolnville neighborhood of the city also bears Galimore's name, and he is depicted on a historical mural painted by schoolchildren on Washington Street.

Death
At age 29, Galimore and teammate Bo Farrington were killed in an automobile accident on July 27, 1964, in Rensselaer, Indiana. Galimore's Volkswagen left the road on a curve and rolled, a few miles from the team's training camp at St. Joseph's College. His number 28 was retired by the Bears.

Personal
His son, Ron Galimore, was the first black U.S. Olympic gymnast.

References

External links
 
 

1935 births
1964 deaths
American football running backs
People from St. Augustine, Florida
Players of American football from Florida
Chicago Bears players
Western Conference Pro Bowl players
Florida A&M Rattlers football players
Road incident deaths in Indiana
College Football Hall of Fame inductees
National Football League players with retired numbers